Dubajić is a Serbian surname. It may refer to:

Simo Dubajić (1923–2009), Serbian soldier
Slobodan Dubajić (born 1963), retired Serbian footballer
Bojan Dubajić (born 1990), Serbian footballer

See also
Dubić, similar surname

Serbian surnames